An outdoor granite sculpture of Alexander Hamilton by Carl Conrads is installed in Central Park, Manhattan, New York. Hamilton's son, John C. Hamilton, commissioned Conrads to sculpt this statue, which was dedicated on November 22, 1880, and donated to the city. Conrads used the bust of Hamilton created by the sculptor Giuseppe Ceracchi as a model for Hamilton's head.

American founding father Alexander Hamilton lived nearby in Manhattan, at Hamilton Grange, when he died in 1804.

Description
Hamilton is dressed in Colonial style with a wig, ruffled collar, knickers, and buckle shoes. His right hand is on his chest, while his left hand is holding a rolled document, resting on a stone column. Thirteen stars encircle the top of the pedestal. A sword, scabbard and military hat are near the base of the pedestal.

Conrads, working for New England Granite Works owned by James G. Batterson,  used a block of Westerly granite since it was both beautiful and durable, able to withstand the highest pressures.

Dedication

The dedication, held on November 22, 1880, a cold and windy day, was attended by nearly 500 people. Hamilton's son, John C. Hamilton, made a brief speech to the crowd and guests, including members of the Society of the Cincinnati. Hamilton described the statue:

The Mayor, Edward Cooper, then made a brief address praising Alexander and thanking John C. for his donation.

Since the weather was so bad, the outdoor ceremony was moved inside the Metropolitan Museum of Art where later speakers included Alexander Hamilton Bullock and Chauncey M. Depew. Depew's speech covered Hamilton as a soldier, financier and statesman.

Inscription
On the base of the pedestal:

On the left side:

Legacy
While Ceracchi, born on July 4, 1751, created busts for several founding fathers, his life did not end well. After returning to Europe, he first celebrated Napoleon with a bust, but then turned against him. After an unsuccessful plot, Napoleon had him guillotined at the Place de Grève on January 30, 1801.

References

External links

Sculptures by Carl Conrads
1880 sculptures
Sculptures in Central Park
Statues of Alexander Hamilton
Hamilton
Monuments and memorials in Manhattan
Hamilton
Sculptures of men in New York City
Statues in New York City